Eutreptiella is a genus of Euglenozoa belonging to the family Eutreptiidae.

The genus was first described by A. M. da Cunha in 1914.

The genus has cosmopolitan distribution.

Species:
 Eutreptiella braarudii Throndsen
 Eutreptiella cornubiense Butcher
 Eutreptiella dofleinii  (Schiller) Pascher
 Eutreptiella elegans (Schiller) Pascher
 Eutreptiella eupharyngea Moestrup & R.E.Norris
 Eutreptiella gymnastica Throndsen
 Eutreptiella hirudoidea Butcher
 Eutreptiella marina A.M.da Cunha
 Eutreptiella pascheri (Schiller) Pascher
 Eutreptiella pomquetensis (McLachlan, Seguel & Fritz) Marin & Melkonian

References

Euglenozoa